Zohra Shah was an eight-year-old Pakistani domestic slave of a married couple, Hassan Siddiqui and Umme Kulsoom. She was tortured and killed for mistakenly releasing her masters’ parrots in Bahria Town, Rawalpindi on 1 June 2020. Her death caused an outcry in Pakistan and led to legislative changes which outlawed child domestic labour in the country.

Early life 

Murder
Allegedly, she was murdered for releasing valuable parrots from their cages. Evidence such as 'older scars and marks' suggest Shah had been repeatedly abused while working for Siddiqui and Kulsoom, and 'wounds on her thighs' were 'consistent with sexual assault'.

Aftermath
Siddiqui and Kulsoom were arrested and put on judicial remand.

See also
Murder of Danielle Jones
Murder of Tia Rigg

References

2020 murders in Pakistan
2020 deaths
2020 in Punjab, Pakistan
21st century in Rawalpindi
Child sexual abuse in Pakistan
Crime in Rawalpindi
Deaths by person in Pakistan
Incidents of violence against women
June 2020 crimes in Asia
June 2020 events in Pakistan
Slavery in Pakistan
Torture in Pakistan
Incidents of violence against girls
Violence against women in Pakistan